Cheng is a mukim and town in Melaka Tengah District, Malacca, Malaysia. It is located around 15 km from Malacca City.

Economy
 Cheng Technology Park
 Lotus's Cheng (formerly Tesco Cheng) - Supermarket

See also
 List of cities and towns in Malaysia by population

References

Central Melaka District
Malacca City